Miserere (full title: Miserere mei, Deus, Latin for "Have mercy on me, O God") is a setting of Psalm 51 (Psalm 50 in Septuagint numbering) by Italian composer Gregorio Allegri. It was composed during the reign of Pope Urban VIII, probably during the 1630s, for the exclusive use of the Sistine Chapel during the Tenebrae services of Holy Week, and its mystique was increased by unwritten performance traditions and ornamentation. It is written for two choirs, of five and four voices respectively, singing alternately and joining to sing the ending in 9-part polyphony.

History
Composed around 1638, Allegri's setting of the Miserere was amongst the falsobordone settings used by the choir of the Sistine Chapel during Holy Week liturgy, a practice dating to at least 1514. At some point, several myths surrounding the piece came to the fore, stemming probably from the fact that the Renaissance tradition of ornamentation as practiced in the Sistine Chapel was virtually unknown outside of the Vatican by the time the piece become well-known. This alleged secrecy is advanced by an oft repeated statement that there were only "three authorised copies outside the Vatican, held by Emperor Leopold I, the King of Portugal, and Padre Martini." However, copies of the piece were available in Rome, and it was also frequently performed elsewhere, including such places as London, where performances dating as far back as c. 1735 are documented, to the point that by the 1760s, it was considered one of the works "most usually" performed by the Academy of Ancient Music.

From the same supposed secrecy stems a popular story, backed by a letter written by Leopold Mozart to his wife on April 14 1770, that at fourteen years of age, while visiting Rome, his son Wolfgang Amadeus Mozart first heard the piece during the Wednesday service, and later that day, wrote it down entirely from memory. Doubt has however been cast on much of this story, owing to the fact that the Miserere was known in London, which Mozart had visited in 1764-65, that Mozart had seen Martini on the way to Rome, and that Leopold's letter (the only source of this story) contains several confusing and seemingly contradictory statements. Less than three months after hearing the song and transcribing it, Mozart had gained fame for his musical work and was summoned back to Rome by Pope Clement XIV, who showered praise on him for his feats of musical genius and awarded him the Chivalric Order of the Golden Spur on July 4, 1770.

The original ornamentations that made the work famous were Renaissance techniques that preceded the composition itself, and it was these techniques that were closely guarded by the Vatican. Few written sources (not even Burney's) showed the ornamentation, and it was this that created the legend of the work's mystery. The Roman priest Pietro Alfieri published an edition in 1840 including ornamentation, with the intent of preserving the performance practice of the Sistine choir in both Allegri's and Tommaso Bai's (1714) settings. The work was also transcribed by Felix Mendelssohn in 1831 and Franz Liszt, and various other 18th and 19th century sources, with or without ornamentation, survive.

The version most performed nowadays, with the famous "top C" in the second-half of the 4-voice falsobordone, is based on that published by William Smyth Rockstro in the first edition of the Grove Dictionary of Music and Musicians (1880) and later combined with the first verse of Charles Burney's 1771 edition by Robert Haas (1932). Since this version was popularised after the publication in 1951 of Ivor Atkins' English version and a subsequent recording based upon this by the Choir of King's College Cambridge, Allegri's Miserere has remained one of the most popular a cappella choral works performed.

Recordings

The Miserere is one of the most frequently recorded pieces of late Renaissance music. An early and celebrated recording of it is the one from March 1963 by the Choir of King's College, Cambridge, conducted by David Willcocks, which was sung in English and featured the then-treble Roy Goodman. This recording was originally part of a gramophone LP recording entitled Evensong for Ash Wednesday but the Miserere has subsequently been re-released on various compilation discs.

In 2015 the Sistine Chapel Choir released their first CD, including the 1661 Sistine codex version of the Miserere recorded in the chapel itself.

Performances of the whole work usually last between 12 and 14 minutes.

Music

The work is set as a falsobordone, a technique then commonly used for performing psalm tones in a polyphonic manner. Allegri's setting is based upon the Tonus peregrinus. Verses alternate between a five-part setting sung by the first choir (vv. 1, 5, 9, 13, 17) and a four-part setting sung by the second (vv. 3, 7, 11, 15, 19), interspersed with plain-chant renderings of the other verses. Both choirs come together for a nine-voice finale in verse 20. The original vocal forces for the two choirs were SATTB and SATB, but at some point in the 18th-century one of the two tenors was transposed up an octave, giving the SSATB setting which is most frequently performed today.

Text

Original
The original translation of the psalm used for the piece was in Latin:
Miserere mei, Deus: secundum magnam misericordiam tuam.
Et secundum multitudinem miserationum tuarum, dele iniquitatem meam.
Amplius lava me ab iniquitate mea: et a peccato meo munda me.
Quoniam iniquitatem meam ego cognosco: et peccatum meum contra me est semper.
Tibi soli peccavi, et malum coram te feci: ut justificeris in sermonibus tuis, et vincas cum judicaris.
Ecce enim in iniquitatibus conceptus sum: et in peccatis concepit me mater mea.
Ecce enim veritatem dilexisti: incerta et occulta sapientiae tuae manifestasti mihi.
Asperges me hyssopo, et mundabor: lavabis me, et super nivem dealbabor.
Auditui meo dabis gaudium et laetitiam: et exsultabunt ossa humiliata.
Averte faciem tuam a peccatis meis: et omnes iniquitates meas dele.
Cor mundum crea in me, Deus: et spiritum rectum innova in visceribus meis.
Ne proiicias me a facie tua: et spiritum sanctum tuum ne auferas a me.
Redde mihi laetitiam salutaris tui: et spiritu principali confirma me.
Docebo iniquos vias tuas: et impii ad te convertentur.
Libera me de sanguinibus, Deus, Deus salutis meae: et exsultabit lingua mea justitiam tuam.
Domine, labia mea aperies: et os meum annuntiabit laudem tuam.
Quoniam si voluisses sacrificium, dedissem utique: holocaustis non delectaberis.
Sacrificium Deo spiritus contribulatus: cor contritum, et humiliatum, Deus, non despicies.
Benigne fac, Domine, in bona voluntate tua Sion: ut aedificentur muri Ierusalem.
Tunc acceptabis sacrificium justitiae, oblationes, et holocausta: tunc imponent super altare tuum vitulos.

English translation
This translation is from the 1662 Book of Common Prayer and is used in Ivor Atkins' English edition of the Miserere (published by Novello):

Have mercy upon me, O God: after Thy great goodness.
According to the multitude of Thy mercies, do away mine offences.
Wash me thoroughly from my wickedness: and cleanse me from my sin.
For I acknowledge my faults: and my sin is ever before me.
Against Thee only have I sinned, and done this evil in thy sight: that Thou mightest be justified in Thy saying, and clear when Thou art judged.
Behold, I was shapen in wickedness: and in sin hath my mother conceived me.
But lo, Thou requirest truth in the inward parts: and shalt make me to understand wisdom secretly.
Thou shalt purge me with hyssop, and I shall be clean: Thou shalt wash me, and I shall be whiter than snow.
Thou shalt make me hear of joy and gladness: that the bones which Thou hast broken may rejoice.
Turn Thy face from my sins: and put out all my misdeeds.
Make me a clean heart, O God: and renew a right spirit within me.
Cast me not away from Thy presence: and take not Thy Holy Spirit from me.
O give me the comfort of Thy help again: and stablish me with Thy free Spirit.
Then shall I teach Thy ways unto the wicked: and sinners shall be converted unto Thee.
Deliver me from blood-guiltiness, O God, Thou that art the God of my health: and my tongue shall sing of Thy righteousness.
Thou shalt open my lips, O Lord: and my mouth shall shew [show] Thy praise.
For Thou desirest no sacrifice, else would I give it Thee: but Thou delightest not in burnt-offerings.
The sacrifice of God is a troubled spirit: a broken and contrite heart, O God, shalt Thou not despise.
O be favourable and gracious unto Sion: build Thou the walls of Jerusalem.
Then shalt Thou be pleased with the sacrifice of righteousness, with the burnt-offerings and oblations: then shall they offer young bullocks upon Thine altar.

See also
 Spem in alium
 Leçons de ténèbres

Notes and references

Sources
 A detailed discussion of the piece's authentic sources and manuscript history, and an authentic performing edition. Ben Byram-Wigfield (2014), Ancient Groove Music.

Further reading

External links
  Performance by The Gesualdo Six and the choristers of Blackburn Cathedral
 
 

Music for the Holy Week
Polychoral compositions
Psalm settings
Tenebrae
Compositions in G minor